Chebotarevsky is a rural locality (a khutor) in Bolshovskoye Rural Settlement, Serafimovichsky District, Volgograd Oblast, Russia. The population was 109 as of 2010. There are 5 streets.

Geography 
Chebotarevsky is located on the Tsutskan River, 45 km southwest of Serafimovich (the district's administrative centre) by road. Kotovsky is the nearest rural locality.

References 

Rural localities in Serafimovichsky District